Naresh Harishchandra Patil (born 7 April 1957) is an Indian judge and former Chief Justice of the Bombay High Court.

Career
In 1979, Patil graduated in the faculty of law from the Government Law College, Mumbai under the Bombay University. He was enrolled as an advocate in 1980 and started practice in the District Court at Latur from 1980 to 1982. After that he worked as lawyer in the Bombay High Court. Patil was appointed Honorary Assistant to the Government Pleader in Aurangabad Bench by the Government of Maharashtra in 1983. In 1988 he became Additional Standing Counsel for the Government of India. Patil appeared several times on behalf of the Government and Government undertaking Corporation, Councils, Election Commission, Railways and for various statutory bodies in his career. He was elevated as permanent Justice of the Bombay High Court on 12 October 2001 and became the acting Chief Justice in August 2018.
On 24 October 2018, he was appointed Chief Justice of the Bombay High Court. On 6 April 2019, he retired and he was succeeded by Justice Pradeep Nandrajog.

References

1957 births
Living people
Indian judges
Judges of the Bombay High Court
Chief Justices of the Bombay High Court
20th-century Indian judges
20th-century Indian lawyers
University of Mumbai alumni
21st-century Indian judges